Raymond Mwanyika (1930 − 24 October 2013) was a Tanzanian Roman Catholic bishop.

Ordained to the priesthood on 11 October 1959, Mwanyika was named bishop of Roman Catholic Diocese of Njombe, Tanzania on 16 January 1971 and resigned on 8 June 2002.

References 

1930 births
2013 deaths
20th-century Roman Catholic bishops in Tanzania
21st-century Roman Catholic bishops in Tanzania
Roman Catholic bishops of Njombe